Tetrathemis camerunensis is a species of dragonfly in the family Libellulidae. It is found in Benin, Cameroon, Central African Republic, the Democratic Republic of the Congo, Ivory Coast, Equatorial Guinea, Gabon, Gambia, Ghana, Guinea, Liberia, Nigeria, Togo, and Uganda. Its natural habitats are subtropical or tropical moist lowland forests and shrub-dominated wetlands.

References

Libellulidae
Taxonomy articles created by Polbot
Insects described in 1900